Tõrva Parish is a rural municipality in Valga County. It includes the town of Tõrva.

Settlements
Town
Tõrva

Boroughs
Helme, Hummuli

Villages
Aitsra, Ala, Alamõisa, Holdre, Jeti, Jõgeveste, Kalme, Karjatnurme, Karu, Kaubi, Kirikuküla, Koorküla, Kulli, Kungi, Kähu, Leebiku, Linna, Liva, Lõve, Möldre, Patküla, Piiri, Pikasilla, Pilpa, Pori, Puide Ransi, Reti, Riidaja, Roobe, Rulli, Soe, Soontaga, Taagepera, Uralaane, Vanamõisa, Voorbahi

Religion

References

External links

 
Torva